Rena Okutsu (born 12 May 1997) is a Japanese professional footballer who plays as a defender for WE League club AC Nagano Parceiro Ladies.

Club career 
Okutsu made her WE League debut on 2 October 2021.

References 

Living people
1997 births
Women's association football defenders
WE League players
Japanese women's footballers
Association football people from Kanagawa Prefecture
AC Nagano Parceiro Ladies players